Virt is a municipality in Slovakia. It may also refer to:

 Jake Kaufman, 21st century American video game composer also known as virt
 Yuriy Virt (born 1974), Ukrainian retired football goalkeeper 
 Virt Records, an independent record label

See also
 Terry W. Virts (born 1967), American astronaut and United States Air Force officer